Caldwell Municipal Airport  is a city-owned public-use airport located one nautical mile (1.15 mi, 1.85 km) east of the central business district of Caldwell, a city in Sumner County, Kansas, United States.

Facilities and aircraft 
It has one runway designated 17/35 with a turf surface measuring 2,460 by 110 feet (750 x 34 m). For the 12-month period ending November 19, 2008, the airport had 900 general aviationaircraft operations, an average of 75 per month.

References

External links 
  at Kansas DOT Airport Directory
 Aerial photo as of 17 August 1991 from USGS The National Map
 

Airports in Kansas
Buildings and structures in Sumner County, Kansas